Neptune Distribution was a UK based comic distribution company founded and headquartered in Leicester, which existed from 1985 to 1991. Neptune Comics (as it was named at the outset), began as a small B2C mail order company selling American comics to UK collectors at a time when there were few specialist retail outlets. In early 1986 Neptune Comics also began selling at regional Comic Marts in cities such as Leeds and Sheffield, and by mid 1986 began supplying retail outlets. Neptune Distribution incorporated in 1987 as Neptune Comic Distributors Limited. By this point, Neptune's initial aim of challenging Titan Distribution's monopoly on the UK comic distribution business was well established.

Neptune acted as a sub-distributor in regards to American comics, initially acquiring them from Bud Plant Inc, who were acquired by Diamond Comic Distributors in 1986.

Neptune's arrival was successful at first, and the company expanded into publishing in 1989 with Trident Comics, and in late 1990 helping to found Apocalypse Ltd, which published Toxic!, a weekly title meant to compete with Fleetway Publications's 2000 AD. The company expanded too quickly, however. Financial problems led the distribution side to stop importing American comics in July 1991, as they were unable to pay outstanding bills owed to Diamond. Neptune was then acquired by Diamond Comic Distributors in 1991; this British distribution base enabled Diamond to form Diamond UK. Diamond next acquired Titan Distributors in 1993.

References

External links 

 "The Rise and Fall of Neptune Comic Distributors" by a former employee: Part One, Part Two, Part Three, Part Four, Part Five, Part Six, Part Seven, Part Eight

 
1986 establishments in the United Kingdom
1991 disestablishments in the United Kingdom
Book distributors
British companies established in 1986
Companies based in Leicester
Comic book publishing companies of the United Kingdom
Comics industry
Defunct companies of the United Kingdom
Privately held companies of the United Kingdom
Publishing companies established in 1986